This is a list of casinos and horse racing tracks in Alberta.  The province of Alberta has given out many licences for small casinos but few have attached hotels and none are major resorts.  A partial exception to this rule is the River Cree Resort and Casino which is located on the Enoch Cree Indian Reserve and owned by the Enoch Cree Nation (and therefore partially exempt from provincial jurisdiction).  In addition to these casinos there are temporary caissons set up during major festivals such as K-Days, large "gaming room" full of VLTs in many bars, and approximately 50 bingo halls throughout the province.

Casinos
Several casinos operate in Alberta mainly within the major population centers.

Calgary
 Cash Casino
 Pure Casino Calgary
 Cowboys Casino
 Deerfoot Inn & Casino
 Elbow River Casino
 Century Casino Calgary

Tsuu T'ina First Nation
 Grey Eagle Casino & Bingo

Camrose
 Camrose Resort Casino

Cold Lake
 Casino Dene

Edmonton
 Pure Casino Yellowhead
 Pure Casino Edmonton
 Century Casino & Hotel Edmonton
 Grand Villa Casino Edmonton
 Starlight Casino

Enoch Cree Nation
 River Cree Resort & Casino

Fort McMurray
 Boomtown Casino

Grande Prairie
 Great Northern Casino

Kananaskis
 Stoney Nakoda Resort & Casino

Lethbridge
 Pure Casino Lethbridge

Medicine Hat
 Copper Coulee Casino - Medicine Hat Lodge

Red Deer
 Cash Casino
 Jackpot Casino

St. Albert
 Century Casino St. Albert

Alexis Nakota Sioux Nation
 Eagle River Casino and Travel Plaza

Horse racing tracks

Alberta has four racing entertainment centres or (RECs).

Balzac
Century Downs Racetrack and Casino

Grande Prairie
 Grande Prairie Regional Agricultural & Exhibition Society (Evergreen Park)

Leduc County
 Century Mile Racetrack and Casino

Lethbridge
 Rocky Mountain Turf Club (Whoop-Up Downs)

References

Casinos and horse racing tracks in Alberta
Tourist attractions in Alberta
 
Horse racing in Canada
Casino
Casino
Alberta